The Colonial District includes public schools in the Greater Richmond Region. Colonial District schools compete in the 5A, 4A, 3A, and 2A divisions.

Facts about the district
The Colonial District schools are located north and northwest of the James River, which include Richmond's West End.

Member schools
Deep Run High School of Henrico County
Douglas S. Freeman High School of Henrico County
Mills E. Godwin High School of Henrico County
Glen Allen High School of Henrico County
Hermitage High School of Henrico County
Thomas Jefferson High School of Richmond
John Marshall High School of Richmond
John Randolph Tucker High School of Henrico County

External links 
 VHSL-Reference

Virginia High School League